Reginald Goldsworthy (1919–1981) was an Australian actor, writer and producer of radio and film. In the late 60s he established Goldsworthy Productions which made a number of movies. He started acting in Adelaide and then moved to Melbourne in the 1940s. He worked there for five years before relocating to Sydney, becoming a popular radio actor.

In the late 1960s he moved into film production.

References

External links
Reginald Goldsworthy at National Film and Sound Archive

1919 births
1981 deaths
20th-century Australian male actors
Australian film studio executives